The Saddle is a mountain near Lochgoilhead in The Ardgoil Peninsula in Argyll. It reaches a height of 521m and is in the Arrochar Alps.

Mountains and hills of Argyll and Bute